Rustler's Round-Up is a 1946 American Western film directed by Wallace Fox and written by Jack Natteford. The film stars Kirby Grant, Fuzzy Knight, Poni Adams, Earle Hodgins, Charles Miller, Edmund Cobb and Ethan Laidlaw. The film was released on August 9, 1946, by Universal Pictures.

Plot

Cast         
Kirby Grant as Bob Ryan
Fuzzy Knight as Pinkerton J. 'Pinky' Pratt
Poni Adams as Josephine Fremont
Earle Hodgins as Sheriff Fin Elder
Charles Miller as Judge Wayne
Edmund Cobb as Victor Todd
Ethan Laidlaw as Louie Todd
Mauritz Hugo as Jefferson 'Faro' King
Eddy Waller as Tom Fremont
Frank Merlo as Jules Todd

References

External links
 

1946 films
American Western (genre) films
1946 Western (genre) films
Universal Pictures films
Films directed by Wallace Fox
American black-and-white films
1940s English-language films
1940s American films